Junior Fashion Sakala (born 14 March 1997) is a Zambian professional footballer who plays as a forward for Scottish Premiership club Rangers and the Zambia national team.

Sakala played for Zambian clubs Nchanga Rangers and Zanaco, winning the Zambia Super League in 2016 with the latter. He signed for Spartak Moscow in February 2017. Sakala made no first-team appearances for the club, instead appearing for Spartak-2 Moscow in the second tier of Russian football. He joined Belgian club KV Oostende in July 2018, where he scored 31 goals in 102 appearances over three seasons. He joined Rangers on a free transfer in 2021.

Sakala was a member of the Zambia under-20 team that won the 2017 Africa U-20 Cup of Nations. He made his senior international debut in September 2017.

Club career

Early career
Sakala began his senior career in Zambia with Nchanga Rangers and Zanaco. He helped Zanaco win the Zambia Super League in 2016. In February 2017, he signed a three-year contract with Russian Premier League club FC Spartak Moscow, after being invited for a trial at their training camp in Cyprus. He made his debut in the Russian Football National League for FC Spartak-2 Moscow on 23 March 2017, in a game against FC Baltika Kaliningrad.

On 9 July 2018, he signed a three-year contract with Belgian club KV Oostende.

Rangers
On 4 May 2021, with his Oostende contract due to expire in the summer, Sakala signed a pre-contract agreement with Scottish Premiership club Rangers on a four-year deal. On 31 July, he made his official debut in a 3–0 win over Livingston in the league. On 31 October, he scored his first hat-trick for Rangers in a 6–1 league victory over Motherwell. On 4 October 2022, Sakala made his UEFA Champions League debut as a substitute in a 2–0 away loss against Liverpool.

International career

Youth level
Sakala played youth international football for Zambia at under-20 and under-23 levels. He featured for the Zambia under-20 team that won the 2017 Africa U-20 Cup of Nations, scoring three goals at the tournament. He also played for the under-20 team that reached the quarter-finals of the 2017 FIFA U-20 World Cup, scoring four goals in the tournament. He scored seven goals in ten appearances in total at under-20 level. Sakala played one game for the Zambia under-23 team, against Nigeria at the 2019 Africa U-23 Cup of Nations.

Senior level
Sakala made his debut for the senior Zambia national team on 2 September 2017, in a 2018 FIFA World Cup qualifier against Algeria, and was sent off for two bookings in the 56th minute.

Career statistics

Club

International

Scores and results list Zambia's goal tally first, score column indicates score after each Sakala goal.

Honours 
Zanaco
 Zambia Super League: 2016

Rangers
Scottish Cup: 2021–22
 UEFA Europa League runner-up: 2021–22

Zambia U20
 Africa U-20 Cup of Nations: 2017
 COSAFA U-20 Cup: 2016

References

External links 
 
 

Living people
1997 births
People from Chipata District
Zambian footballers
Association football forwards
Zambia international footballers
Zambia youth international footballers
Zambia under-20 international footballers
2019 Africa U-23 Cup of Nations players
Zambia Super League players
Belgian Pro League players
Nchanga Rangers F.C. players
Zanaco F.C. players
FC Spartak-2 Moscow players
K.V. Oostende players
Rangers F.C. players
Zambian expatriate footballers
Zambian expatriate sportspeople in Russia
Expatriate footballers in Russia
Zambian expatriate sportspeople in Belgium
Expatriate footballers in Belgium
Zambian expatriate sportspeople in Scotland
Expatriate footballers in Scotland
FC Spartak Moscow players